Tricholoma orirubens, commonly known as blushing tricholoma, is an edible gilled mushroom native to Europe. The grey-capped fruit bodies are generally found singly or in small groups in deciduous and coniferous woodland in autumn.

Taxonomy
Tricholoma orirubens was described by French mycologist Lucien Quélet in 1873. The generic name derives from the Greek trichos/τριχος 'hair' and loma/λωμα 'hem', 'fringe' or 'border'. It lies within the section terrea within the subgenus Tricholoma within the genus Tricholoma.

Description
The cap is conical with a slight boss before opening and flattening, eventually with either a boss or central depression. The thick grey gills are emarginate or adnate and widely spaced, and turn red when bruised. The white or pale grey ringless stipe measures 4.5 to 8 cm tall and 0.7 to 2.5 cm wide, and has a distinctive blue tinged base.

Distribution and habitat
Widespread across Europe, Tricholoma orirubens is not common. It is rare in the Netherlands. Found singly or in small groups in deciduous and coniferous woodland in autumn, it prefers clayey or chalky soils. It is ectomycorrhizal.

Tricholoma orirubens can also form fairy rings.

Edibility
Smelling and tasting strongly of flour, T. orirubens is one of the more appetising members of the genus. It can taste sweet as well.

See also
List of Tricholoma species

References

orirubens
Edible fungi
Fungi of Europe
Fungi found in fairy rings
Fungi described in 1873